USS Toad was a United States Navy patrol vessel in commission from 1918 to 1919.

Toad was built in 1914 as a private motorboat of the same name by D. R. Shackford. On 4 August 1918, the U.S. Navy acquired her from Shackford for use as a section patrol boat during World War I. She never received a section patrol (SP) number, but was commissioned as USS Toad on 4 September 1918.

Assigned to the 5th Naval District, Toad served on section patrol duties for the rest of World War I. The Navy returned her to Shackford on 27 January 1919.

References

NavSource Online: Section Patrol Craft Photo Archive Toad

Patrol vessels of the United States Navy
World War I patrol vessels of the United States
1914 ships